The 2014 Western & Southern Open (the Cincinnati Masters) was a men's and women's tennis tournament that was played on outdoor hard courts August 11–17, 2014. It was part of the ATP World Tour Masters 1000 of the 2014 ATP World Tour and of the WTA Premier 5 tournaments of the 2014 WTA Tour. The 2014 tournament was the men's 113th edition and the women's 86th edition of the Cincinnati Masters. The tournament is held annually at the Lindner Family Tennis Center in Mason (a suburb of Cincinnati), Ohio, United States.

Rafael Nadal and Victoria Azarenka were the defending champions, but both had to withdraw from the tournament due to injuries.

Points and prize money

Point distribution

Prize money

ATP singles main-draw entrants

Seeds

 Rankings are as of August 4, 2014

Other entrants
The following players received wild cards into the main singles draw:
  Robby Ginepri
  Steve Johnson
  Sam Querrey
  Jack Sock

The following player used protected ranking to gain entry into the singles main draw:
  Jürgen Melzer

The following players received entry from the singles qualifying draw:
  Benjamin Becker
  Chase Buchanan
  Teymuraz Gabashvili
  Marinko Matosevic
  Benoît Paire
  Bernard Tomic
  James Ward

The following player received entry as a lucky loser:
  Blaž Rola

Withdrawals
Before the tournament
  Nicolás Almagro (foot injury) → replaced by  Denis Istomin
  Carlos Berlocq → replaced by  Édouard Roger-Vasselin
  Juan Martín del Potro (wrist injury) → replaced by  Martin Kližan
  Alexandr Dolgopolov (knee injury) → replaced by  Julien Benneteau
  Richard Gasquet (abdominal injury) → replaced by  Blaž Rola
  Tommy Haas (shoulder injury) → replaced by  Lu Yen-hsun
  Florian Mayer (groin injury) → replaced by  Lleyton Hewitt
  Rafael Nadal (wrist injury) → replaced by  Gilles Simon
  Kei Nishikori (foot injury) → replaced by  Nicolas Mahut
  Dmitry Tursunov → replaced by  Dominic Thiem

ATP doubles main-draw entrants

Seeds

 Rankings are as of August 4, 2014

Other entrants
The following pairs received wildcards into the doubles main draw:
  Steve Johnson /  Sam Querrey
  Mackenzie McDonald /  Tim Smyczek
The following pair received entry as alternates:
  Jamie Murray /  John Peers

Withdrawals
Before the tournament
  Michaël Llodra (right elbow injury)

WTA singles main-draw entrants

Seeds

Rankings are as of August 4, 2014

Other entrants
The following players received wild cards into the main singles draw:
  Belinda Bencic
  Lauren Davis
  Christina McHale

The following player used protected ranking to gain entry into the singles main draw:
  Romina Oprandi

The following players received entry from the singles qualifying draw:
  Annika Beck
  Irina-Camelia Begu
  Zarina Diyas
  Nicole Gibbs
  Polona Hercog
  Karin Knapp
  Varvara Lepchenko
  Pauline Parmentier
  Chanelle Scheepers
  Taylor Townsend
  Heather Watson
  Yanina Wickmayer

The following player received entry as a lucky loser:
  Mona Barthel

Withdrawals
Before the tournament
  Victoria Azarenka (knee injury) → replaced by  Mona Barthel
  Li Na (knee injury) → replaced by  Romina Oprandi
  Yvonne Meusburger → replaced by  Tsvetana Pironkova

WTA doubles main-draw entrants

Seeds

 Rankings are as of August 4, 2014

Other entrants
The following pairs received wildcards into the doubles main draw:
  Nicole Gibbs /  Alison Riske
  Melanie Oudin /  Taylor Townsend

The following pair received entry as alternates:
  Oksana Kalashnikova /  Olga Savchuk

Withdrawals
Before the tournament
  Zhang Shuai (right arm injury)

Retirements
  Klaudia Jans-Ignacik (right calf injury)
  Kristina Mladenovic (lumbar spine injury)

Finals

Men's singles

  Roger Federer defeated  David Ferrer, 6–3, 1–6, 6–2

Women's singles

  Serena Williams defeated  Ana Ivanovic, 6–4, 6–1

Men's doubles

  Bob Bryan /  Mike Bryan defeated  Vasek Pospisil /  Jack Sock, 6–3, 6–2

Women's doubles

   Raquel Kops-Jones /  Abigail Spears defeated  Tímea Babos /  Kristina Mladenovic, 6–1, 2–0, ret.

References

External links
 Official website
 Association of Tennis Professionals (ATP) tournament profile